Jana Blahová (born November 22, 1984) is a Czech sprint canoer who has competed since the mid-2000s. She won a silver medal in the K-2 500 m event at the 2006 ICF Canoe Sprint World Championships in Szeged.

Blahová also finished eighth in the K-2 500 m event at the 2008 Summer Olympics in Beijing.

References

Sports-reference.com profile

1984 births
Canoeists at the 2008 Summer Olympics
Czech female canoeists
Living people
Olympic canoeists of the Czech Republic
ICF Canoe Sprint World Championships medalists in kayak